Aufstehen (German: Stand up) is a left-wing collective movement founded by Die Linke politician Sahra Wagenknecht in the summer of 2018. Its co-founders and participants include leading members of Germany's left-oriented parties as well as supporters from science and the arts. Their aim is to exert pressure on German political parties and to bring about a shift to the left in politics and society. This includes focusing on the issues concerning voters lost to new right-wing movements which have recently emerged in German politics. Inspirations for the movement include Jean-Luc Mélenchon's movement La France Insoumise and Momentum, the organisation founded in support of the British Labour Party leader Jeremy Corbyn.

Founding 
The founding of the movement had been debated for months when its website was launched on 4 August 2018. It was officially launched on 4 September 2018 at a press conference in Berlin. Among the founders are members of The Left, the SPD and the Greens. Notable figures involved include the sociologist Wolfgang Streeck and SPD politician Simone Lange, who was defeated for the leadership of the party in 2018 by Andrea Nahles. The background to the founding of the movement is the surge of right-wing parties worldwide, including Germany. The founders of Aufstehen argue against the rise in social injustice and urge leftist parties to unite in order to bring about a change in German politics. Wagenknecht has also stated that the continuation of the grand coalition of the CDU/CSU and the SPD after the 2017 federal election was also a stimulus to the founding of the movement, arguing that this would lead to a continuation of policies that would increase economic inequality and insecurity and benefit far-right groups such as the Alternative for Germany.

Policies 
Aufstehen, an "extreme left" collective, is according to some media "hostile toward immigration".  Wagenknecht, who advocates "against an open-border policy for Germany", considers open borders to be politically naïve.

References

External links 

 Official website

 
2018 establishments in Germany
Anti-immigration politics in Germany
Left-wing politics in Germany
Organizations established in 2018
Political movements in Germany
Political organisations based in Germany